The Wind River meridian, established in 1875, is one of the principal meridians for Wyoming. The initial point is near Fort Washakie, Wyoming.

See also
List of principal and guide meridians and base lines of the United States

References

External links

Meridians and base lines of the United States
Named meridians
Geography of Wyoming
1875 establishments in Wyoming Territory